Asthma and Allergy Foundation may refer to:
Asthma and Allergy Foundation, Scottish charity founded by Martina Chukwuma-Ezike
Asthma and Allergy Foundation of America